In philosophy, universality or absolutism is the idea that universal facts exist and can be progressively discovered, as opposed to relativism, which asserts that all facts are merely relative to one's perspective. Absolutism and relativism have been explored at length in contemporary analytic philosophy.

Also see Kantian and Platonist notions of "universal", which are considered by most philosophers to be separate notions.

Universality in ethics

When used in the context of ethics, the meaning of universal refers to that which is true for "all similarly situated individuals". Rights, for example in natural rights, or in the 1789 Declaration of the Rights of Man and of the Citizen, for those heavily influenced by the philosophy of the Enlightenment and its conception of a human nature, could be considered universal. The 1948 Universal Declaration of Human Rights is inspired by such principles.

Universality about truth
In logic, or the consideration of valid arguments, a proposition is said to have universality if it can be conceived as being true in all possible contexts without creating a contradiction. Some philosophers have referred to such propositions as universalizable. A truth is considered to be universal if it is logically valid in and also beyond all times and places. Hence a universal truth is considered logically to transcend the state of the physical universe, whose order is derived from such truths. In this case, such a truth is seen as eternal or as absolute. The patterns and relations expressed by mathematics in ways that are consistent with the fields of logic and mathematics are typically considered truths of universal scope. This is not to say that universality is limited to mathematics, since it is also used in philosophy, theology, and other pursuits.

The relativist conception of truth denies the existence of some or all universal truths, particularly ethical ones (as moral relativism). Though usage of the word truth has various domains of application, relativism does not necessarily apply to all of them.

Universals in metaphysics

In metaphysics, a universal is a proposed type, property, or relation which can be instantiated by many different particulars. While universals are related to the concept of universality, the concept is importantly distinct; see the main page on universals for a full treatment of the topic.

See also

Natural law
Natural and legal rights
Moral universalism
Universal law
Tianxia
Ubuntu

References

External links

Concepts in metaphysics

sk:Absolútna pravda